Massachusetts v. Environmental Protection Agency, 549 U.S. 497 (2007), is a 5–4 U.S. Supreme Court case in which twelve states and several cities of the United States, represented by James Milkey, brought suit against the Environmental Protection Agency (EPA) to force that federal agency to regulate carbon dioxide and other greenhouse gases (GHGs) as pollutants.

Background
Section 202(a)(1) of the Clean Air Act (CAA), 42 U.S.C. § 7521(a)(1), requires the Administrator of the Environmental Protection Agency to set emission standards for "any air pollutant" from motor vehicles or motor vehicle engines "which in his judgment cause[s], or contribute[s] to, air pollution which may reasonably be anticipated to endanger public health or welfare."

In 2003, the EPA made two determinations:
The EPA lacked authority under the CAA to regulate carbon dioxide and other GHGs for climate change purposes.
Even if the EPA did have such authority, it would decline to set GHG emissions standards for vehicles.

Parties

The petitioners were the states of California, Connecticut, Illinois, Maine, Massachusetts, New Jersey, New Mexico, New York, Oregon, Rhode Island, Vermont and Washington, the cities of New York, Baltimore, and Washington, D.C., the territory of American Samoa, and the organizations Center for Biological Diversity, Center for Food Safety, Conservation Law Foundation, Environmental Advocates, Environmental Defense, Friends of the Earth, Greenpeace, International Center for Technology Assessment, National Environmental Trust, Natural Resources Defense Council, Sierra Club, Union of Concerned Scientists, and the U.S. Public Interest Research Group. James Milkey of the Massachusetts Attorney General's Office represented the petitioners in oral arguments before the U.S. Supreme Court.

Respondents were the Environmental Protection Agency, the Alliance of Automobile Manufacturers, National Automobile Dealers Association, Engine Manufacturers Association, Truck Manufacturers Association,  Litigation Group, Utility Air Regulatory Group, and the states of Michigan, Alaska, Idaho, Kansas, Nebraska, North Dakota, Ohio, South Dakota, Texas, and Utah.

Appeals court

The U.S. Court of Appeals for the District of Columbia Circuit decided on September 13, 2005, to uphold the decision of the EPA. However, appellate judges were sharply at odds in their reasoning for reaching the majority conclusion.

The lower court was sharply divided on whether the petitioners had "standing", a personalized injury creating a right to claim remedial action from the government through the courts (i.e., rather than to seek favorable action by pressing for supportive legislation). One of the three judges found no standing while a second of the three postponed a factual decision for any later trial. Although it had granted certiorari, the Supreme Court could have revisited the question of standing to dodge a difficult decision and dismiss the case for lack of standing. However, once certiorari has been granted, such a reversal is rare.

Granting of certiorari

On June 26, 2006, the Supreme Court granted a writ of certiorari.

Issues
 Whether the petitioners had standing.
 Whether carbon dioxide is an "air pollutant" causing "air pollution" as defined by the CAA. If carbon dioxide is not an air pollutant causing air pollution, then the EPA has no authority under the CAA to regulate carbon dioxide emissions. If the CAA governs carbon dioxide, the EPA Administrator could decide not to regulate carbon dioxide, but only consistent with the terms of the CAA.
 Whether the EPA Administrator may decline to issue emission standards for motor vehicles on the basis of policy considerations not enumerated in section 202(a)(1).

Arguments
The Petitioners argued that the definition in the CAA is so broad that carbon dioxide must be counted as an air pollutant. They claimed that the question was controlled by the words of the statute, so that factual debate was immaterial. Furthermore, the Petitioners filed substantial scientific evidence that the toxicity of carbon dioxide results from high concentrations and that causation of global warming transforms the gas into a pollutant.

If the statutory definition of the CAA includes carbon dioxide, then the Federal courts would have no discretion to reach any other conclusion. The definition contained in the statute, not evidence or opinion, would control the outcome.

The law's definition of air pollutant contains "any air pollution agent or combination of such agents, including any physical, chemical, biological, radioactive ... substance or matter which is emitted into or otherwise enters the ambient air, ..."  Both sides agreed that  and greenhouse gases are part of the second half.  Petitioners argued that the use of 'including' automatically means greenhouse gases are part of the first group, 'any air pollution agent' which was not separately defined.  EPA argued that this is wrong because 'Any American automobile, including trucks and minivans, ... ' does not mean that foreign trucks are American automobiles.

The Petitioners asserted that the EPA Administrator's decision not to regulate carbon dioxide and other greenhouse gases violated the terms of the CAA. Thus, the Supreme Court also considered whether the reasons given by the EPA were valid reasons within the CAA statute for the EPA Administrator to decide not to regulate carbon dioxide. The EPA argued that the Administrator has the discretion under the CAA to decide not to regulate.

The EPA Administrator argued that other actions are already being taken to increase fuel efficiency of automobiles and that (as of 2003) scientific investigation was still under way.  Thus, the EPA Administrator decided not to regulate "at this time".

This case has become notable because of a widespread perception that the truth or falsehood of theories of global warming will be decided by the courts. While this could eventually occur in later proceedings, the questions before the U.S. Supreme Court here were much more narrow, and legal in nature.

One of several reasons that the EPA Administrator declined to regulate carbon dioxide is uncertainty about whether man-made carbon dioxide emissions cause global warming. This has attracted great attention to the case. However, the Supreme Court only decided whether the Administrator's reason is a valid reason within the CAA. The Supreme Court did not explicitly decide if it is true or untrue that man-made carbon dioxide emissions cause global warming, although high-profile comments by Justices during oral argument are likely to affect the public debate.

The Petitioners argued that scientific uncertainty is not a valid basis for the EPA Administrator to decline to regulate.  The question before the Supreme Court "was not whether the causation is true or untrue," but whether it is a valid reason for the Administrator to not regulate a pollutant.

Opinion of the Court 
First, the petitioners were found to have standing. Justice Stevens reasoned that the states had a particularly strong interest in the standing analysis. The majority cited Justice Holmes' opinion in Georgia v. Tennessee Copper Co. (1907):

"The case has been argued largely as if it were one between two private parties; but it is not. The very elements that would be relied upon in a suit between fellow-citizens as a ground for equitable relief are wanting here. The State owns very little of the territory alleged to be affected, and the damage to it capable of estimate in money, possibly, at least, is small. This is a suit by a State for an injury to it in its capacity of quasi-sovereign. In that capacity the State has an interest independent of and behind the titles of its citizens, in all the earth and air within its domain. It has the last word as to whether its mountains shall be stripped of their forests and its inhabitants shall breathe pure air."

Second, the Court held that the CAA gives the EPA the authority to regulate tailpipe emissions of greenhouse gases. The CAA provides:

"The Administrator shall by regulation prescribe (and from time to time revise) in accordance with the provisions of this section, standards applicable to the emission of any air pollutant from any class or classes of new motor vehicles or new motor vehicle engines, which in his judgment cause, or contribute to, air pollution which may reasonably be anticipated to endanger public health or welfare."

The CAA defines "air pollutant" as "any air pollution agent or combination of such agents, including any physical, chemical, biological, radioactive ... substance or matter which is emitted into or otherwise enters the ambient air". The majority opinion commented that "greenhouse gases fit well within the CAA's capacious definition of air pollutant."

Finally, the Court remanded the case to the EPA, requiring the agency to review its contention that it has discretion in regulating carbon dioxide and other greenhouse gas emissions.  The Court found the current rationale for not regulating to be inadequate and required the agency to articulate a reasonable basis in order to avoid regulation.

Roberts' dissent
Chief Justice Roberts authored a dissenting opinion. First, the dissent condemns the majority's "special solicitude" conferred to Massachusetts as having no basis in Supreme Court cases dealing with standing. The dissent compares the majority opinion to "the previous high-water mark of diluted standing requirements," United States v. SCRAP (1973). Roberts then argues that the alleged injury (i.e., Massachusetts' loss of land because of rising sea levels) is too speculative and without adequate scientific support. The dissent also finds that even if there is a possibility that the state may lose some land because of global warming, the effect of obliging the EPA to enforce automobile emissions is hypothetical at best. According to Roberts, there is not a traceable causal connection between the EPA's refusal to enforce emission standards and petitioners' injuries. Finally, the dissent maintains that redressability of the injuries is even more problematic given that countries such as India and China are responsible for the majority of the greenhouse-gas emissions. The Chief Justice concludes by accusing the majority of lending the Court as a convenient forum for policy debate and of transgressing the limited role afforded to the Supreme Court by the U.S. Constitution.

Scalia's dissent
First, Justice Scalia found that the Court has no jurisdiction to decide the case because petitioners lack standing, which would have ended the inquiry. However, since the majority saw fit to find standing, his dissent continued.

The main question is, "Does anything require the Administrator to make a 'judgment' whenever a petition for rulemaking is filed?" Justice Scalia sees the Court's answer to this unequivocally as yes, but with no authority to back it. He backs this assertion by explaining that the "statute says nothing at all about the reasons for which the Administrator may defer making a judgment"—the permissible reasons for deciding not to grapple with the issue at the present time. Scalia saw no basis in law for the Court's imposed limitation.

In response to the Court's statement that, "If the scientific uncertainty is so profound that it precludes EPA from making a reasoned judgment as to whether greenhouse gases contribute to global warming, EPA must say so," Scalia responded that EPA has done precisely that, in the form of the National Research Council panel that researched climate-change science.

Remand
On remand, EPA found that six greenhouse gases "in the atmosphere may reasonably be anticipated both to endanger public health and to endanger public welfare." On February 16, 2010, the states of Alabama, Texas, and Virginia and several other parties sought judicial review of EPA's determination in the U.S. Court of Appeals, District of Columbia Circuit. On June 26, 2012, the court issued an opinion which dismissed the challenges to the EPA's endangerment finding and the related GHG regulations. The three-judge panel unanimously upheld the EPA's central finding that GHG such as carbon dioxide endanger public health and were likely responsible for the global warming experienced over the past half century.

A later Supreme Court case in 2022, West Virginia v. EPA, found that the EPA had taken undue authority within the major questions doctrine on regulation of emissions and promoting alternate forms of energy for power plants in the Clean Power Plan. In response, part of the Inflation Reduction Act of 2022 includes language to address the Court's decision in West Virginia, and codified the findings in Massachusetts in that carbon dioxide among several other greenhouse gases were within the EPA's remit to regulate as pollutants under the Clean Air Act.

See also
 Utility Air Regulatory Group v. Environmental Protection Agency (2014)
 Effects of global warming
 Global warming
 Global warming controversy and Climate change denial
 Intergovernmental Panel on Climate Change - Fourth Assessment Report
 List of United States Supreme Court cases
 List of United States Supreme Court cases, volume 549
 Regulation of greenhouse gases under the Clean Air Act
 Standing (law)

Notes

Further reading
Suing the Tobacco and Lead Pigment Industries: Government Litigation as Public Health Prescription by Donald G. Gifford. Ann Arbor, University of Michigan Press, 2010. 
The Rule of Five: Making Climate History at the Supreme Court by Richard J. Lazarus, Harvard University Press, 2020.

External links

 CRS Report (public domain—may be copied verbatim into article with citations)
 New York Times article of April 2, 2007 relating to decision
 [ Transcript of Oral Arguments]
 Bloomberg report of 6/26/2006

Climate change policy in the United States
United States environmental case law
United States Environmental Protection Agency
United States Constitution Article Three case law
United States Supreme Court cases
United States Supreme Court cases of the Roberts Court
2007 in the environment
2007 in United States case law
v. Environmental Protection Agency
Climate change litigation